is a Japanese manga series written and illustrated by Motoro Mase. The manga was serialized in Shogakukan's Weekly Young Sunday (2005–2008) and Weekly Big Comic Spirits (2008–2012). A national prosperity law has been passed in a dystopian nation resulting in citizens between the ages of 18–24 being randomly selected to die for the good of the nation. These citizens are given 24-hour notification of their impending death. These notifications are known as "ikigami"—the ostensible reason for this system being to help demonstrate the value of life. The manga was adapted into a live-action film titled Ikigami in 2008 with Tomoyuki Takimoto as its director.

Plot summary
In first grade, all students receive an inoculation. A small percentage of these inoculations includes a nano capsule which via radio-control will kill the receiver somewhere between the ages of 18–24. The government believes that the threat of unexpected death will increase prosperity and productivity in its citizens. And indeed this increased prosperity is evident, but at a great cost: innocent lives. Citizens who do not agree with the National prosperity law and who publicly voice their opinions are accused of "thought crime."

Kengo Fujimoto (Shota Matsuda) has been recruited by the government as an Ikigami delivery man. Whilst undergoing training he witnesses the "arrest" of a man (also undergoing training to become a deliverer) who commits a thought-crime when he yells to the entire room that the law is wrong and that his older sister died from the ikigami. The film follows Kengo as he delivers Ikigami to three citizens: a rising musician (Yuta Kanai) debuting in the music industry but struggling with leaving his friend behind as a busker, a shut-in (Kazuma Sano) who is the son of a council woman (Jun Fubuki) who supports the law whole-heartedly and  attempts to use her son's upcoming death to gain sympathy votes, and a working-class debt collector (Takayuki Yamada) who is about to take his blind sister (Riko Narumi) out of the orphanage she lives in now that he is finally financially secure. 
 
During the film we discover that thought-crime criminals are most likely brain-washed and then returned to society, strongly believing in the national prosperity law when they return. Throughout the film Kengo struggles not to commit thought-crimes publicly as he feels that the law is wrong. Towards the end of the film Kengo walks past a school where the year ones are entering; there are nurses encouraging children to have their inoculations. Kengo sees the man who was taken from his Ikigami deliverance training, standing in a lab coat encouraging the children to get their inoculations, supporting the brainwashing theory.

Media

Manga

Ikigami: The Ultimate Limit, written and illustrated by Motoro Mase, was serialized in Shogakukan's Weekly Young Sunday from January 27, 2005, to July 31, 2008, when the magazine ceased its publication. The manga continued in Shogakukan's Weekly Big Comic Spirits from September 6, 2008, and finished on February 6, 2012. Shogakukan collected its chapters in ten tankōbon volumes, released between August 5, 2005, and March 30, 2012.

The manga was licensed in North America by Viz Media, which released the first tankōbon volume on May 12, 2009. The manga is also licensed in France by Asuka, in Spain and Italy by Panini Comics, in Taiwan by Sharp Point Press, in Korea by Haksan Culture Company, in Poland by Hanami, and Indonesia by Level Comics

Film
The manga was adapted into a live-action film titled Ikigami in 2008 with Tomoyuki Takimoto as its director.

Reception

The manga was nominated for the Angoulême International Comics Festival. As of May 2009, it has sold over 1 million copies in Japan.

References

External links

2005 manga
Dystopian anime and manga
Manga adapted into films
Psychological thriller anime and manga
Science fiction anime and manga
Seinen manga
Sharp Point Press titles
Shogakukan manga
Viz Media manga